No Country for Old Men is a 2005 novel by American author Cormac McCarthy, who had originally written the story as a screenplay. The story occurs in the vicinity of the Mexico–United States border in 1980 and concerns an illegal drug deal gone awry in the Texas desert back country. Owing to the novel's origins as a screenplay, the novel has a simple writing style different from other Cormac McCarthy novels. The book was adapted into the 2007 film No Country for Old Men, which won four Academy Awards, including Best Picture.

Title 
The title of the novel comes from the first line of the 1926 poem "Sailing to Byzantium" by W. B. Yeats.

Plot 
The plot follows the interweaving paths of the three central characters (Llewelyn Moss, Anton Chigurh, and Ed Tom Bell) set in motion by events related to a drug deal gone bad near the Mexican–American border in remote Terrell County in south-west Texas.

In 1980, while hunting pronghorns, Llewelyn Moss stumbles across the aftermath of a drug deal gone awry that has left everyone dead, save a sole badly wounded Mexican who pleads with Moss for water. Moss responds that he does not have any and searches the rest of the vehicles, finding a truck full of heroin. He searches for the "last man standing" and finds him dead some distance off with a satchel containing $2.4 million in cash. He takes the money and returns home. Later, however, feeling remorse for leaving the wounded man and simultaneously desiring to know more of the circumstances surrounding the deal gone wrong and the money, he returns to the scene with a jug of water, only to find that the wounded man had since been shot and killed. When Moss looks back to his truck parked on the ridge overlooking the valley, another truck is there. After being seen, he tries to run, which sparks a tense chase through a desert valley. This is the beginning of a hunt for Moss that stretches for most of the remaining novel. After escaping from his pursuers, Moss sends his wife, Carla Jean, to her grandmother in Odessa, Texas, while he leaves his home with the money.

Sheriff Ed Tom Bell investigates the drug crime while trying to protect Moss and his young wife, with the aid of other law enforcement. Bell is haunted by his actions in World War II, leaving his incapacitated unit to die (having had no practical alternative), for which he received a Bronze Star. Now in his late 50s, Bell has spent most of his life attempting to make up for the incident when he was a 21-year-old soldier. He makes it his quest to resolve the case and save Moss. Complicating things is the arrival of Anton Chigurh, hired to recover the money. Chigurh is a ruthless, calculating killer whose weapons of choice are a silenced shotgun and a captive bolt pistol (called a "stungun" in the text), the latter of which he uses for close kills and to blow out cylinder locks. Carson Wells, a rival hitman and ex-Special Forces officer who is familiar with Chigurh, is also on the trail of the stolen money. After a brutal shootout that spills across the Mexican border and leaves both Moss and Chigurh wounded, Moss recovers at a Mexican hospital while Chigurh patches himself up in a hotel room with stolen supplies. While recuperating, Moss is approached by Wells, who offers to give him protection in exchange for the satchel and tells him his current location and phone number, instructing him to call when he has "had enough."

After recovering and leaving the hotel room, Chigurh finds Wells and murders him just as Moss calls to negotiate the exchange of money. After answering Wells' phone, Chigurh tells Moss that he will kill Carla Jean unless he hands over the satchel. Moss remains defiant and soon after, calls Carla Jean and tells her that he will meet up with her at a motel in El Paso. After much deliberation, Carla Jean decides to inform Sheriff Bell about the meeting and its location. Unfortunately for her and her husband, this call is traced and provides Moss' location to some of his hunters. Later, Sheriff Bell goes to the hospital to identify Moss' body, murdered by a band of Mexicans who were also after the drug deal cash. Later that night, Chigurh arrives at the scene and retrieves the satchel from the air duct in Moss' room. He returns it to its owner and later travels to Carla Jean's house. She pleads for her life and he offers her to flip a coin to decide her fate, and she initially refuses, declaring, "The coin don't have no say." However, she ultimately chooses heads, and the coin turns out to be tails. Soon after, as he is leaving, he is hit by a car, which leaves him severely injured, but still alive. After bribing a pair of teenagers to remain silent about the car accident, he limps off down the road.

After a long investigation that fails to locate Chigurh, Bell decides to retire and drives away from the local courthouse feeling overmatched and defeated. At the end of the book, Bell describes two dreams he experienced after his father died. In one, he met his father in town and borrowed some money from him. In the second, Bell was riding his horse through a snow-covered pass in the mountains. As he rode, he could see his father up ahead of him carrying a moon-colored horn lit with fire, and he knew that his father would ride on through the pass and fix a fire out in the dark and cold and that it would be waiting for him when he arrived.

Reception 
The early and late critical reception of the novel was mixed. William J. Cobb, in a review published in the Houston Chronicle (July 15, 2005), characterizes McCarthy as "our greatest living writer" and describes the book as "a heated story that brands the reader's mind as if seared by a knife heated upon campfire flames". In the July 24, 2005, issue of The New York Times Book Review, the critic and fiction writer Walter Kirn suggests that the novel's plot is "sinister high hokum", but writes admiringly of the prose, describing the author as "a whiz with the joystick, a master-level gamer who changes screens and situations every few pages".

In contrast, literary critic Harold Bloom did not count himself among the admirers of No Country for Old Men, stating that it lacked the quality of McCarthy's best works, particularly Blood Meridian, and compared it to William Faulkner's A Fable. When comparing the lack of "moral argument" in Blood Meridian to the heightened morality present in No Country for Old Men, he considered stating that the "apocalyptic moral judgments" made in No Country for Old Men represented "a sort of falling away on McCarthy's part".

The novel has received a significant amount of critical attention, for example, Lynnea Chapman King, Rick Wallach and Jim Welsh's edited collection No Country for Old Men: From Novel to Film or Raymond Malewitz's "Anything Can Be an Instrument: Misuse Value and Rugged Consumerism in Cormac McCarthy's No Country for Old Men."

Film adaptation 

In 2007, Joel and Ethan Coen adapted the book into a film, also titled No Country for Old Men, which was met with critical acclaim and box office success. On January 27, 2008, the film won the Screen Actors Guild Award for Outstanding Performance by a Cast in a Motion Picture. On February 24, 2008, it won four Academy Awards: Best Picture, Best Director (Joel and Ethan Coen), Best Adapted Screenplay (Joel and Ethan Coen), and Best Supporting Actor (Javier Bardem as Anton Chigurh).

References

Further reading 

2005 American novels
Novels by Cormac McCarthy
American novels adapted into films
Fiction set in 1980
Novels set in the 1980s
Novels set in Texas
Novels set in Mexico
Terrell County, Texas
Books with cover art by Chip Kidd